This is a list of cities and towns in Free State Province, South Africa.

In the case of settlements that have had their official names changed the traditional name is listed first followed by the new name.

Eastern Free State
 Arlington
 Bethlehem
 Clarens
 Clocolan
 Cornelia
 Excelsior
 Ficksburg
 Fouriesburg
 Harrismith
 Hobhouse
 Kestell
 Ladybrand
 Lindley
 Marquard
 Memel
 Paul Roux
 Petrus Steyn
 Witsieshoek (Phuthaditjhaba)
 Reitz
 Rosendal
 Senekal
 Steynsrus
 Swinburne
 Tweespruit
 Van Reenen
 Vrede
 Warden 
 Winburg

Lejweleputswa (formerly GoldFields)
 Allanridge
 Boshof
 Bothaville
 Brandfort
 Bultfontein
 Dealesville
 Hennenman
 Hertzogville
 Hoopstad
 Mvela 
 Odendaalsrus
 Theunissen
 Ventersburg
 Verkeerdevlei
 Virginia
 Welkom
 Wesselsbron
 Winburg

Northern Free State
 Deneysville
 Edenville
 Frankfort
 Heilbron
 Koppies
 Kroonstad
 Oranjeville
 Parys
 Sasolburg
 Tweeling
 Viljoenskroon
 Villiers
 Vredefort

Transgariep
 Bethulie
 Bloemfontein
 Botshabelo
 Dewetsdorp
 Edenburg
 Fauresmith
 Jacobsdal
 Jagersfontein
 Koffiefontein
 Luckhoff
 Petrusburg
 Philippolis
 Reddersburg
 Rouxville
 Smithfield
 Springfontein
 Blesberg (Thaba 'Nchu)
 Trompsburg
 Van Stadensrus
 Wepener
 Zastron

 
Free State